Emergence is the process of complex pattern formation from more basic constituent parts.

Literature
 Emergence (Palmer novel), a 1984 science fiction book by David R. Palmer
Emergence (Birmingham novel), a 2015 novel by John Birmingham
 Emergence (C. J. Cherryh novel), a 2018 science fiction novel by C. J. Cherryh
 Emergence: The Connected Lives of Ants, Brains, Cities, and Software, a 2001 book by Steven Berlin Johnson
 Emergence: Labeled Autistic, a 1986 book by Temple Grandin
 Emergence, a science fiction book by Ray Hammond
 Metamorphosis (also known as Emergence), a 2016 pornographic manga

Music
 Emergence (Whit Dickey album), 2009
 Émergence (Natasha St-Pier album), 1996
 Emergence, a 1992 album by R. Carlos Nakai
 Emergence (Miroslav Vitous album), 1985
 Emergence (Neil Sedaka album), 1971
 Emergence: The Music of TNA Wrestling, the fifth studio album of TNA Wrestling

Other
 Emergence (Star Trek: The Next Generation), a 1994 Star Trek: The Next Generation episode
 Emergence International, a worldwide community of Christian Scientists
 The process of return to baseline physiologic function of all organ systems after the cessation of general anaesthesia
 Emergence (TV series), a 2019 American drama series
 Impact Wrestling Emergence, an annual professional wrestling event held by Impact Wrestling

See also
 Emergency (disambiguation)
 Emergent (disambiguation)
 Emergentism, an approach to philosophy of complex systems